Donacaula sicarius is a moth in the family Crambidae. It was described by Philipp Christoph Zeller in 1863. It is found in Venezuela.

References

Moths described in 1863
Schoenobiinae